is a private junior high and high school in Setagaya, Tokyo, operated by the Seijo Gakuen institute.

Notable alumni

Politicians
Yūko Obuchi
Takao Fujii
Yasuhide Nakayama
Yuichiro Hata
Tsutomu Hata
Yoko Komiyama
Kōki Ishii

Writers
Shōhei Ōoka
Kōbō Abe

Conductors
Seiji Ozawa
Michiyoshi Inoue
Yuki Ito

Singers
Ryoko Moriyama
Naotarō Moriyama
Hiromi Iwasaki
Yoshimi Iwasaki
Yutaro Miura
Kikuchi Fuma
Hiroki Maekawa

Actors
Masakazu Tamura
Ryō Tamura
Ken Ishiguro
Masanobu Takashima
Masahiro Takashima
Yukiyoshi Ozawa
Mitsuhiro Oikawa
Takahiro Miura
Mayu Tsuruta
Yuko Ito
Yoshino Kimura
Haruna Ikezawa (Voice Actor)

Tarento
Moe Yamaguchi
Tomu Muto
Marino Miyata

Filmmakers
Kenta Fukasaku
Kazuko Kurosawa

Athletes
Yuji Matsuo
Yuki Ishikawa
Shoko Yoshimura

Others
Shu Uemura, Makeup Artist

See also
 Seijo University
 Lycée Seijo

References

External links
 Seijo Gakuen Junior High School and High School 

High schools in Tokyo
Schools in Tokyo

simple:Toyoji Takahashi